Francisco Zamora de Orello, O.F.M. Conv.  was a Roman Catholic prelate who served as Titular Bishop of Brefny (1523–?).

Biography
Francisco Zamora de Orello was ordained a priest in the Order of Friars Minor Conventual. On 26 Nov 1523, he was appointed during the papacy of Pope Clement VII as Titular Bishop of Brefny. While bishop, he was the principal co-consecrator of Juan de Zumárraga, Bishop of México (1533).

References 

16th-century Roman Catholic titular bishops
Bishops appointed by Pope Clement VII
Conventual Franciscan bishops